The South Mountains (O'odham: Muhaḍagĭ Doʼag, Yavapai: Wi:ki'tiyeda), known locally as simply South Mountain, is a mountain range in central Arizona in south Phoenix, Arizona. It is on public land managed by the city of Phoenix as South Mountain Park.

Geologically, the South Mountains are thought to be a metamorphic core complex: evidence of movement of the North American tectonic plates from southwest to northeast and northeast to southwest, pushing up a series of mountain ranges including South Mountain. Other ridges with parallel orientation lie within the basin covered by basin fill sediments. The structural basin forms the Phoenix metro area, which appears flat like a lake around mountains that rise over it like islands. The buried ridges are in the same orientation as the South Mountains, about one km high, and about one km apart from peak to peak, perhaps about 15 of them underneath the basin fill.

The mountain, along with the nearby Sierra Estrella, is considered sacred by the Akimel O'odham and the Kwevkepaya band of Yavapai.

The South Mountain Preserve is part of the Phoenix Parks System and is the second largest municipal park in the world. The preserve features recreational facilities such as ramadas, hiking and mountain biking trails, and equestrian facilities.

Peaks 
The major peaks of the South Mountains are (W to E):

 Maricopa Peak (2523 ft)
 Goat Hill (2526 ft)
Contains numerous radio and television transmitting towers serving the Phoenix area, including those of the ABC, CBS, FOX and NBC network-affiliated stations.

Features 

Alta Ridge is the ridge on the eastern end of Maricopa peak.
Telegraph Pass is the gap between South Mountain to the east and Goat Hill to the West.
Fat Man's Pass is located on the National Trail and is a rock formation.
Mystery Castle is in the foothills on the north side and was built from odd materials and trash around 1930 as a private residence.
There are approximately 20 communications towers on the peak of South Mountain.
There are ruins of both ancient Indian and more contemporary origin, and there are many petroglyphs carved into the desert varnish on the rocks.

Geography and ecology
A spur plateau of the Salt River Mountains was described by an early survey of the area as the dividing feature of the Salt River valley.

There are a variety of flora and fauna within the Salt River Mountains. One of the notable tree species here is the elephant tree, Bursera microphylla.

References

 C. Michael Hogan. 2009. Elephant Tree: Bursera microphylla, GlobalTwitcher.com, ed. N. Stromberg
 United States Dept. of the Interior. 1883. Annual report of the United States Geological and Geographical Survey of the Territories (U.S.), Geological and Geographical Survey of the Territories (U.S.); Washington DC: U.S. G.P.O., 1874–1883.

External links
South Mountain Trails - Interactive Map HikeArizona.COM
Map of mountains in the Phoenix area

Mountain ranges of Arizona
Mountain ranges of Maricopa County, Arizona